Robert Alan McDonald (born June 20, 1953) served as the eighth United States Secretary of Veterans Affairs. He is the retired chairman, president, and CEO of Procter & Gamble. In 2014 he became Secretary of Veterans Affairs.

Early life and education
McDonald was born on June 20, 1953 in Gary, Indiana, and grew up in Chicago. He graduated from the U.S. Military Academy at West Point in 1975 in the top 2% of his class with a Bachelor of Science degree in Engineering. At West Point he served as the Brigade Adjutant for the Corps of Cadets and was awarded the Silver Medal from the Royal Society for the Encouragement of Arts, Manufacturing and Commerce. After graduation, he served in the U.S. Army for five years, primarily in the 82nd Airborne Division, attaining the rank of captain, and earned an MBA from the University of Utah in 1978. Upon leaving the military he received the Meritorious Service Medal.

Career
McDonald joined Procter & Gamble in 1980 and worked in various roles before becoming president and Chief Executive in 2009. He assumed the Chairman of the Board role 2010. As chief executive officer, McDonald oversaw a $10 billion restructuring plan.

Amid the 2008 economic downturn, investors criticized McDonald for being too loyal to P&G traditions, too slow to pursue layoffs and other cuts, and unable to produce new product innovations, particularly compared to his predecessor and replacement A.G. Lafley. He resigned from P&G in 2013 following pressure from the company board and activist investors such as Bill Ackman; he was replaced by his predecessor A.G. Lafley, who returned from retirement.

In 2014 McDonald led a community-based task force to help the city of Cincinnati renovate its Museum Center, which succeeded when Hamilton County passed a tax levy to fund the initiative.

U.S. Secretary of Veterans Affairs

McDonald succeeded Eric Shinseki, who resigned in 2014, due to the Veterans Health Administration scandal of 2014.

In 2014, U.S. President Obama nominated McDonald to the Cabinet position of United States Secretary of Veterans Affairs.

Obama cited McDonald's business background with P&G and experience revitalizing organizations in his decision. McDonald was approved by the United States Senate Committee on Veterans' Affairs and the full Senate by unanimous vote.

McDonald recruited new medical personnel in the early months of his tenure at VA. As of June 2015, VA had increased onboard staff.McDonald opposed privatization of the VA. Donald Trump replaced him with David Shulkin, who also opposed privatization, and was also replaced.

In 2015, McDonald admitted he misspoke trying to engage a homeless veteran about his serving in the U.S. Army Special Forces, a conversation that was recorded by a CBS television news crew accompanying him during a nationwide count of homeless veterans. "I have no excuse, I was not in the special forces" he told The Huffington Post, which first broke the story. The Huffington Post reported that "special operations forces" includes the Army Rangers and that McDonald "completed Army Ranger training and took courses in jungle, arctic and desert warfare. He qualified as a senior parachutist and airborne jumpmaster, and was assigned to the 82nd Airborne Division until he resigned his commission in 1980. While he earned a Ranger tab designating him as a graduate of Ranger School, he never served in a Ranger battalion or any other special operations unit.

Board work 
McDonald is on the boards of RallyPoint Networks and serves on the Board of Directors of Partnership for Public Service, Audia International, the Association of Graduates of the United States Military Academy, the Boulder Crest Retreat Foundation, and the McCormick Research Institute.

Philanthropy 
McDonald and his wife, Diane, founded the McDonald Conference for Leaders of Character.

Personal life
In July 2020, McDonald was appointed by the George W. Bush Institute as the April and Jay Graham Fellow where he serves as a member of the Military Service Initiative team. In September 2020, McDonald was selected by presidential nominee Joe Biden to be a member of his transition team's advisory board.

McDonald donated a statue of General Ulysses S. Grant that was unveiled on April 25, 2019 on The Plain at West Point.

In 2007, McDonald received the inaugural Leadership Excellence Award from the U.S. Naval Academy and Harvard Business Review.  He serves on the Board of Directors of Xerox, the McKinsey Advisory Council, and the Singapore International Advisory Council of the Economic Development Board.

McDonald and his wife, Diane, have two children.

References

External links

1953 births
Living people
21st-century American politicians
American chief executives
American chief operating officers
Directors of Xerox
Obama administration cabinet members
People from Chicago
Politicians from Gary, Indiana
Procter & Gamble people
United States Military Academy alumni
United States Secretaries of Veterans Affairs
David Eccles School of Business alumni